Count Woronzeff is a 1934 German film directed by Arthur Robison and starring Albrecht Schoenhals, Hansi Knoteck and Willy Birgel. A separate French version The Secret of Woronzeff was also released. It was shot at UFA's Babelsberg and Templehof Studios in Berlin. The film's sets were designed by the art directors Erich Kettelhut and Max Mellin. Location filming took place in Cannes on the French Riviera.

Cast
 Albrecht Schoenhals as Fürst Woronzeff & Baron Franz von Naydek
 Hansi Knoteck as Woronzeffs Tochter Nadja
 Willy Birgel as Petroff, Woronzeffs Sekretär
 Heinrich Berg as Otto von Naydek, Bruder Franz von Naydeks
 Brigitte Helm as Diane Morell
 Amanda Lindner as Tante Lydia
 Fritz Odemar as Onkel Gregor
 Günther Lüders as Vetter Boris
 Jakob Tiedtke as Onkel Iwan
 Kurt Fuß as Léon, Agent
 Edwin Jürgensen as Der Untersuchungsrichter
 Vladimir Sokoloff as Petroff
 Walther Ludwig as Sänger: Duett aus 'Samson und Dalida'
 Ruth Berglund as Sängerin - Duett aus 'Samson und Dalila'
 Fred Goebel
 Adele Sandrock
 Elisabeth von Ruets

References

Bibliography

External links 
 

1934 films
Films of Nazi Germany
1930s German-language films
Films directed by Arthur Robison
German multilingual films
German black-and-white films
UFA GmbH films
1934 multilingual films
1930s German films
Films shot at Tempelhof Studios
Films shot at Babelsberg Studios